Christel Quek is a Singaporean British entrepreneur and executive in technology, blockchain and consumer electronics.
 She co-founded Bolt (social network)  in 2017 and is currently based in London, United Kingdom. She was listed in Forbes 30 Under 30 in 2019.

Early life and Education 
Quek was born in Singapore and a Singaporean government scholar. When she was 19 years old, she broke her scholarship bond of service to the Singapore Government while in her first year of university at the National University of Singapore.
Quek holds a Bachelor of Social Sciences  in  Geography from National University of Singapore.

Career 
Quek started her career in 2009 working with Havas Media Group as the Social Media Strategist and
Global Social Manager for the firm. In 2012, She worked with Samsung Electronics as the Regional Social Business Lead for Southeast Asia, Oceania, and Taiwan.

In 2013, Quek joined Twitter as one of the first 10 employees in Singapore and rose to become the Head of Content for the platform up until 2015 when she left. In May 2015, she worked with Brandwatch and started the company's  first office in Asia while serving as the Vice President  the  Asia-Pacific region of the company.

In September 2017, Quek served as the  Strategic Advisor and Chief Marketing Officer (CMO) for  Zilliqa, a blockchain platform. In the same September 2017, she  co-founded Bolt, a  global social media ecosystem and also became the Chief Techology Officer of the company.   She built Bolt+ , a global social network, and BoltX, a self-custody wallet for digital assets.

Awards and recognition 
 2020 – Listed in Prestige 40 Under 40 (2020)

 2019 – Listed in Forbes 30 Under 30 (2019)

 2019 - Holmes Report Innovator 25

 2015 – Listed in 30 best people in Advertising to follow on Twitter (2015)

 2014 -  Shortlisted in 30 Best People in Advertising to Follow on Twitter (2014) 2014 – Featured among  20 Women to Watch in Asia-Pacific Marketing 2013 – Feaured among Top 10 Digital Strategists To Watch in 2013''

References

External links
 Bolt Global website

Living people
Women company founders
Singaporean women in business

Year of birth missing (living people)